Pedro Gastão of Orléans-Braganza (19 February 191327 December 2007) was the Head of the Petrópolis branch of the House of Orléans-Braganza and a claimant to the defunct Brazilian throne in opposition to the Vassouras branch claim led by his cousins Princes Pedro Henrique and Luiz.

Pedro Gastão was born during the exile of the Brazilian Imperial Family, being the second child and first son of Pedro de Alcântara, Prince of Grão-Pará, sometime heir to the throne of the Empire of Brazil, and Countess Elisabeth Dobrzensky of Dobrzenicz. Never having accepted his father's 1908 renunciation as valid, he actively claimed the Brazilian throne from his father's death in 1940 until his own in 2007.

Pedro Gastão was also uncle to the pretenders to the thrones of Portugal (Duarte Pio, Duke of Braganza) and France (Henri, Count of Paris) and grandfather to the heir apparent to the defunct Yugoslav throne (Philip, Hereditary Prince of Yugoslavia).

Early life

Pedro Gastão, whose name was after his father and grandfather, was born on 19 February 1913 in France in the Château d'Eu, at the homonymous town of Eu, Seine-Maritime, where the Brazilian Imperial Family was installed since 1905. His father, Pedro de Alcântara, Prince of Grão-Pará, was the older son of Isabel, Princess Imperial of Brazil, and had been expected from birth to eventually inherit the Imperial Throne of Brazil naturally. His mother, Countess Elisabeth Dobrzensky of Dobrzenicz, was a member of an old Bohemian noble family. He was brother to Isabelle, Countess of Paris, Maria Francisca, Duchess of Braganza, Prince João Maria and Princess Teresa Teodora.

Pedro Gastão spent his youth in Europe, largely at his family's Parisian home in the Boulogne sur Seine suburb: "I have very good memories of my grandparents [...] In exile in France I was always brought up thinking of Brazil not France or Portugal." In 1922 he saw Brazil for the first time, two years after the repeal of the Banishment Law against the Imperial Family. The family was repatriated and settled at the Imperial Palace of Grão-Pará, at the town of Petrópolis, where Pedro Gastão attended the Notre Dame de Sion school which rented his father's Palace of Petrópolis.

Succession
When Pedro Gastão was born, it had been five years since his father had signed the instrument of resignation, by which he theoretically would have renounced the rights of succession to the throne of Brazil for himself and his offspring. The document was accepted by the Princess Imperial and by most royalists.

A few years before his death Pedro Gastão's father Prince Pedro de Alcântara told a Brazilian newspaper:
"My resignation was not valid for many reasons: besides, it was not a hereditary resignation."

Following the death of his father, and supported by Infante Alfonso, Duke of Calabria and Infante Juan, Count of Barcelona, Prince Pedro Gastão declared himself Head of the Imperial Family of Brazil. His position was supported by Francisco Morato, law professor at the University of São Paulo, who concluded the resignation of Pedro Gastão's father was not a valid legal or monarchical act. Professor Paulo Napoleão Nogueira da Silva in the 1990s published a report saying that the resignation of his father was invalid under all possible aspects of Brazilian Law.

He represented a rival claim to that of his cousin's son, Prince Luiz of Orléans-Braganza, to be the heir of the deposed Emperor Pedro II of Brazil, despite the renunciation signed by his father in 1908 when he married, without dynastic approval, a Bohemian noblewoman.

Pedro Gastão died aged 94 on 27 December 2007.

His dynastic claim to the head of the imperial house is currently assumed by his male grandson Pedro Tiago de Orléans e Bragança (born 12 January 1979).

Marriage and children

  

He married Princess Maria de la Esperanza of Bourbon-Two Sicilies (1914–2005), a daughter of Prince Carlos of the Two Sicilies, Infante of Spain and Princess Louise of Orléans a maternal aunt of Juan Carlos I King of Spain, on 18 December 1944 in Seville, Spain, and had six children:

Pedro Carlos of Orléans-Braganza (born 31 October 1945), married Rony Kuhn de Souza (20 March 1938 – 14 January 1979) on 2 September 1975, with issue. He remarried Patricia Branscombe (22 November 1962 – 21 November 2009) on 16 July 1981, with issue. He married Patrícia Alvim Rodrigues in 2018 (civilly) and on 9 October 2021 (religiously).
Pedro Tiago de Orléans e Bragança (born 12 January 1979).
Felipe de Orléans e Bragança (born 31 December 1982).
Maria da Gloria of Orléans-Braganza (born 13 December 1946), married Alexander, Crown Prince of Serbia and Yugoslavia on 1 July 1972, divorced in 1985, with issue. She remarried Ignacio de Medina y Fernández de Córdoba, 19th Duke of Segorbe on 24 October 1985, with issue:
Prince Peter of Yugoslavia (born 1980)
Philip, Hereditary Prince of Yugoslavia (born 1982), married Danica Marinković (born 1986) on 7 October 2017, with issue: 
Prince Stefan of Yugoslavia (born 2018)
Prince Alexander of Yugoslavia (born 1982)
Sol de Medina y Orléans-Bragança, Countess of Ampurias (born 1986)
Luna de Medina y Orléans-Bragança, Countess of Ricla (born 1988)
Prince Alfonso of Orléans-Braganza (born 25 April 1948), married Maria Juana Parejo Gurruchaga (born 1954) on 3 January 1973, divorced with issue. He remarried Silvia-Amália Hungria de Silva Machado on 19 November 2002. 
Princess Maria de Orléans-Bragança (born 1974), married Walter Santiago Estellano, has a son.
Princess Julia de Orléans-Bragança (born 1977)
Prince Manuel of Orléans-Braganza (born 17 June 1949), married Margarita Haffner (born 10 December 1945) on 12 December 1977, divorced in 1995, with issue:
Princess Luiza de Orléans-Bragança (born 1978)
Prince Manuel de Orléans-Bragança (born 1981), married Cássia Letícia Ferreira Kerpel.
Princess Cristina of Orléans-Braganza (born 16 October 1950), married Prince Jan Paweł Sapieha-Rozanski (26 August 1935 – 6 August 2021) on 16 May 1980, sometime Belgian ambassador to Brazil divorced in 1988, with issue:
Princess Anna Teresa Sapieha-Rozanski (born 1981), married Benjamin Furlong, has a son.
Princess Paola Sapieha-Rozanski (born 1983), married in 2012 Prince Constantin Nicolas Swiatopolk-Czetwertyński (born 1978).
Prince Francisco of Orléans-Braganza (born 9 December 1956), married Christina Schmidt-Pecanha (born 14 January 1953) on 28 January 1978, divorced, with issue. He remarried Rita de Cássia Pires in 1980, with issue:
Prince Francisco de Orléans-Bragança (born 1979), married Mathieu Nyssens on 11 January 2023. 
Prince Gabriel de Orléans-Bragança (born 1989)
Princess Manuela de Orléans-Bragança (born 1997)

Later years

Business
The prince ran the Companhia Imobiliária de Petrópolis (Petrópolis Imobiliary Company), that collected the laudemium fee, until the end of the 20th century. Still in the mountain town of Petrópolis, in the 1950s, he acquired the newspaper Tribuna de Petrópolis, founded in 1902, and currently managed by his son, Prince Francisco. In 1954 he came to an agreement with his siblings for the definitive sale of the Château d'Eu to the Prefecture of Eu.

1993 Brazilian constitutional referendum
In the early 1990s, during the referendum in which the Brazilian people should opt for the monarchy or the republic, Pedro Gastão was one of the most engaged in the campaign for the monarchy. But with the defeat of the cause, in advanced age, the prince eventually left the country and disallowed the initiative of some of his supporters to found a monarchist party in Brazil. He retired to his wife's property in Villamanrique-de-la-Condessa, near Seville, Spain.

Death
The couple's last years of life were spent at the princess's estate, where both passed away. Princess Maria de la Esperanza died before him, in 2005, leaving him only with his caretakers and being constantly visited by two of his children who lived in Seville. Prince Pedro Gastão died in the early hours of 27 December 2007, at the age of 94, and was buried the following day, in the chapel of Villamanrique de la Condesa. He received a State funeral with the presence of the Spanish monarchs.

Ancestors

References

External links
Brazilian Constitutional Monarchy Historic-Cultural Website
Brilliant Match – Time Magazine

Pretenders to the Brazilian throne
1913 births
2007 deaths
Heads of the Imperial House of Brazil
House of Orléans-Braganza
French people of Czech descent
Brazilian people of Czech descent
People from Eu, Seine-Maritime